Bofors 40 mm gun is a name or designation given to two models of 40 mm calibre anti-aircraft guns designed and developed by the Swedish company Bofors:

Bofors 40 mm L/60 gun - developed in the 1930s, widely used in World War II and into the 1990s
Bofors 40 mm Automatic Gun L/70 - modernized replacement design of the 40 mm L/60, entering service in the 1950s

Other Bofors gun disambiguation pages 
Bofors 57 mm gun
Bofors 120 mm gun

External links